is a Japanese manga series written and illustrated by Keigo Shinzō. It was serialized in Shogakukan's Monthly Big Comic Spirits from June 2015 to January 2017, with its chapters collected in three tankōbon volumes. It was adapted into a 10-episode Japanese television drama which was broadcast on Nippon TV from July to September 2018.

Media

Manga
Tokyo Alien Bros., written and illustrated by Keigo Shinzō, ran in Shogakukan's Monthly Big Comic Spirits from June 27, 2015, to January 27, 2017. Shogakukan collected its chapters in three tankōbon volumes, released from February 12, 2016, to March 10, 2017.

Volume list

Drama
The manga was adapted into a 10-episode Japanese television drama which aired on Nippon TV from July 23 to September 24, 2018.<ref></p></ref>

See also
Nora to Zassō, another manga series by the same author
Hirayasumi, another manga series by the same author

Reception
The manga was nominated for the Best Comic Award at the 45th Angoulême International Comics Festival in 2018.

References

External links
 
 

Comedy anime and manga
Nippon TV dramas
Science fiction anime and manga
Seinen manga
Shogakukan manga